Ribeiroia ondatrae, or the frog-mutating flatworm is a parasite in the genus Ribeiroia which is believed to be responsible for many of the recent increases in amphibian limb malformations, particularly missing, malformed, and additional hind legs.

It was first reported from livers of Ondatra, hence its specific name. In recent studies, it was found that in areas infected with R. ondatrae, the population of amphibian limb malformations was much higher than populations in which this trematode was not present. Each species studied showed varying results. For example, amphibians of species Pseudacris regilla, Rana aurora and Taricha torosa were found to physically display a higher frequency in the number of abnormalities.

The exact mechanism of deformation has not been determined but it has been theorized that deformation results from mechanical disruption of the cells involved in limb bud formation during the amphibian larval stage.

Life cycle
The first intermediate host is the ram's horn snail.
The second intermediate hosts are fish and larval amphibians including frogs and salamanders.
Inside amphibians, cercariae are attracted to limb bud regions where the hind limbs form. As a result, large numbers of metacercariae encyst near the base of the hind legs. The definitive hosts are predators such as hawks, herons, ducks, and badgers.

The abundance of the teratogenic trematode Ribeiroia ondatre has been found to increase in eutrophic (nutrient rich) waters.

Enhanced transmission
An important factor to the R. ondatrae infections is the exposure to run off nutrients, i.e. eutrophication.  Fertilizers have phosphates in them which is also a predictor of larval trematode abundance in amphibians. The herbicide atrazine has proven to weaken amphibians’ immune systems which causes frogs to become more prone to R. ondatrae infections which in turn causes predators such as birds to attack the multiple or missing limbed frogs. Since herbicides and pesticides affect the prevalence of R. ondatrae in frogs, they tend to increase mortality and pathology due to extra or missing limbs.

Location of infection
R. ondatrae’s mechanism of causing malformations is still unknown, but there seems to be evidence in which areas of the body it infects more. Studies show that when frogs or toads are affected with R. ondatrae it seems that the most common spot for any deformity is on the hind limbs. But the amount of exposure to R. ondatrae cercariae appears to determine where a deformity will occur.  For instance, a moderate amount of R. ondatrae can affect the forelimbs of amphibians, but a heavy parasite load does not affect the forelimbs and only causes deformities in hind limbs.

Species infected
Green frog
Pacific chorus frog
Northern leopard frog
Long-toed salamander
California newt
Western toad
Northern red-legged frog
Columbia Spotted frog
Wood frog

References

Plagiorchiida
Parasites of amphibians